John O'Neill (December 17, 1822 – May 25, 1905) was an American lawyer and politician who served as a U.S. Representative from Ohio for one term from 1863 to 1865,

Early life and career 
Born in Philadelphia, O'Neill attended the common schools at Frederick, Maryland, and Georgetown College, Washington, D.C. He was graduated from Mount St. Mary's College, Emmitsburg, Maryland, and from the law department of Georgetown College, Washington, D.C., in 1841. He was admitted to the bar in 1842. He moved to Zanesville, Ohio, in 1844 and commenced the practice of law.

He served as the prosecuting attorney of Muskingum County in 1845. He also held various county offices. He was United States Attorney for the Southern District of Ohio 1856-1858.

Congress 
O'Neill was elected as a Democrat to the Thirty-eighth Congress (March 4, 1863 - March 3, 1865). He resumed the practice of his profession.

Later career and death 
He served as member of the Ohio Senate 1883-1885. He then practiced law until his death in Zanesville, Ohio, on May 25, 1905. He was interred in St. Thomas' Cemetery.

Sources

1822 births
1905 deaths
Politicians from Philadelphia
Politicians from Zanesville, Ohio
Presidents of the Ohio State Senate
Mount St. Mary's University alumni
Georgetown University Law Center alumni
County district attorneys in Ohio
19th-century American politicians
United States Attorneys for the Southern District of Ohio
Democratic Party members of the United States House of Representatives from Ohio
Georgetown College (Georgetown University) alumni